Anne-Marie Descôtes (born 5 December 1959 in Lyon) is a French diplomat who has been serving as Ambassador of France to Germany since 6 June 2017. She succeeded Philippe Étienne and is the first woman to head the French embassy in reunified Germany.

Education
Descôtes attended the Ecole normale supérieure (ENS) in 1979 and the Ecole nationale d’administration (ENA), earning a bachelor’s degree in art history and a degree in Germanic studies.

Other activities
 European Council on Foreign Relations (ECFR), Member

References

1959 births
Living people
Ambassadors of France to Germany
French women ambassadors
Diplomats from Lyon
ENS Fontenay-Saint-Cloud-Lyon alumni
École nationale d'administration alumni
Officers of the Ordre national du Mérite